Lohana Berkins (15 June 1965 – 5 February 2016) was an Argentine travesti activist.

Biography
Berkins was born on 15 June 1965 in Pocitos, Salta. Her father, a soldier, kicked her out at the age of 13.

In 1994, Berkins founded the Asociación de Lucha por la Identidad Travesti y Transexual (ALITT), which she presided over until her death. She was the driving force behind Law 3062 on respect for identity adopted by travestis and transsexuals and approved by the Buenos Aires Legislature in 2009.

In 2002, Berkins starred in a fundamental demand for the visibility of travestis and trans people by enrolling in Normal School No. 3 to become a teacher. Faced with the impossibility of doing so with her name, she lodged a complaint with the Ombudsman of the City of Buenos Aires, which ordered the school authorities to respect her gender identity.

She was a legislative adviser (mandate fulfilled) at the Autonomous City of Buenos Aires for the Communist Party (led by Patricio Echegaray), thus becoming the first travesti person with a public job. She also worked as a legislative advisor for the Buenos Aires deputy Diana Maffía, on issues such as Human Rights, Guarantees, Women, Children, Children and Adolescents.

She was a candidate for national deputy in the year 2001, accepted in the electoral lists officialized by the Electoral Justice on the occasion of the renewal of positions of the Argentinian Congress.

In 2008, she led the creation of the Nadia Echazú Textile Cooperative, the first Cooperative School for travestis and transsexuals. It was named after Nadia Echazú, as a tribute to the trans activist. The labor enterprise managed and administrated by travesti people was inaugurated in mid 2008, in a place donated by the National Institute of Associations and Social Economy.

In 2010, the National Front for the Gender Identity Law was created. It was an alliance of more than fifteen organizations that promoted the sanction at a national level of a law guaranteeing the adaptation of all personal documents to the gender identity perceived and the name chosen by each person and the access to medical treatments for those who request interventions on their body. The bill was finally presented (as a unified project, agreed between the different social organizations) and accepted. It was the only project that contemplated full access to health care.

The Gender Identity Law was approved by the Argentine parliament on 9 May 2012 and promulgated by the President Cristina Fernández de Kirchner a few days later, becoming the most advanced in the world in this matter so far. It was the first law to recognize the gender identity of people in terms of self-perception and guarantee full access to health, depathologizing trans identities.

In 2013, she was appointed head of the Office of Gender Identity and Sexual Orientation, which operates under the auspices of the Gender Observatory in the Justice departement of the City of Buenos Aires.

Berkins died in the Hospital Italiano in Buenos Aires on 5 February 2016.

Bibliography

Books
 2005. Berkins, Lohana; Fernández, Josefina (coords.). La gesta del nombre propio: informe sobre la situación de la comunidad travesti en la Argentina. Buenos Aires: Madres de Plaza de Mayo.
 2007. Korol, Claudia; Berkins, Lohana, (coords.). Diálogo: "prostitución/trabajo sexual: las protagonistas hablan". Buenos Aires: Feminaria. .
 2007. Berkins, Lohana. Cumbia, copeteo y lágrimas. Buenos Aires: ALITT. .
 2008. Berkins, Lohana. Escrituras, polimorfías e identidades. Buenos Aires: Libros del Rojas. .

Book chapters
 2003. "Un itinerario político del travestismo". In Maffía, Diana (comp.). Sexualidades migrantes: género y transgénero. Buenos Aires: Feminaria. .
 2004. "Eternamente atrapadas por el sexo". Fernández, Josefina; D'Uva, Mónica; Viturro, Paula (coords.). Cuerpos ineludibles: un diálogo a partir de las sexualidades en América Latina. Buenos Aires: Ají de Pollo. .
 2008. "Travestis: una identidad política". Grande, Alfredo (comp.). La sexualidad represora. Buenos Aires: Topía. .
 2010. "Travestismo, transsexualidad y transgeneridad". In Raíces Montero, Jorge Horacio (coord.). Un cuerpo, mil sexos: intersexualidades. Topía. .

Distinctions and recognitions
On 20 July 2011, the government of the Province of Buenos Aires awarded her a distinction – as the owner of the Nadia Echazú Textile Cooperative – called "The Inclusion Tree". On 11 October of that same year she was declared Outstanding Personality of Human Rights by the Buenos Aires Legislature.

In 2012, she received the nomination for the Democracy Awards presented by the Caras y Caretas Cultural Center, in the Human Rights category.

Filmography
Participation in the documentary Furia travesti, a story about the experience of the Nadia Echazú Textile Cooperative, directed by Amparo González Aguilar in 2010.

References

External links
 Escuela Cooperativa Textil de Trabajo “Nadia Echazú”
 Especial Lohana Berkins en Perfil.com
 Frente Nacional por la Ley de Identidad de Género

1965 births
2016 deaths
20th-century Argentine LGBT people
21st-century Argentine LGBT people
Anti-prostitution feminists
Argentine feminists
Argentine essayists
Argentine people of Bolivian descent
Argentine LGBT writers
Argentine LGBT rights activists
Transgender rights activists
Transfeminists
Travestis